Aludeniya is a village in Sri Lanka. It is located within Kandy District, Central Province, west of Galagedara, south of Gunadaha.

History
During the Kandyan period, the village was one of many village that were "degraded" by King Raja Sinha, for showing cowardice during the Sinhalese–Portuguese War. The village was inhabited by "Gattaru—Vellalas". A vihāra was built after 1815 by Kinigomuwe Unnanse.

Demographics

See also
List of towns in Central Province, Sri Lanka

References

External links

Populated places in Kandy District